Spokane, Portland and Seattle Railway's Class A-3 was a class of 0-6-0 steam locomotive switchers.

Background

Design Features

Construction History

Operational history

Numbering

Disposition

References 

A-3
0-6-0 locomotives
ALCO locomotives
Steam locomotives of the United States
Standard gauge locomotives of the United States
Railway locomotives introduced in 1914